/

The caja, a drum similar to a tambora, is one of the three main or traditional instruments of the Vallenato music.  Caja, the slang word adopted to nickname this drum, means "box" in Spanish. There is also a Caribbean drum called caja, used in the music of Colombia.

Origins
African slaves brought by the Spanish colonizers came along with tamboras to what is now northeastern Colombia probably derived from the Congolese makuta drum.  Tamboras were first adopted by the Cumbia musical genre and later introduced to Vallenato music. With the advancement of technology new make and models developed the traditional drum into an instrument similar in make to a conga.

Parts

Modern Version: similar in made to a congas drum but shorter in height (approximately ). Made out of the same wood base but no ropes are used to stretch and hold the skin, instead a metal frame bolted to the wooden base is used to hold the animal skin or X-ray photo (radiograph) made skin.

Playing the Caja
Vallenato has four different rhythms to which the caja adapts to mark the base key: Rubbing and strucking with hand palms.
 Son
 Paseo
 Merengue
 Puya

Hand drums
Vallenato
Colombian musical instruments